Virtua Tennis 2009 (Power Smash: Live Match! in Japan) is a 2009 video game developed by Sumo Digital and published by Sega. It is part of the Virtua Tennis series, following Virtua Tennis 3.

Overview
Virtua Tennis 2009 includes World Tour Mode and includes a fully integrated online ranking system. All new create-a-player options give the gamer the ability to create anyone. The game features more than 40 different courts to play on, including locations such as Dubai and Shanghai, etc.
Mini-games are back in this iteration, with 12 court games, including new entries: Pot Shot, Pirate Wars, Block Buster, Count Mania, Zoo Feeder, and Shopping Dash.

The Wii version of Virtua Tennis 2009 is the first game released on that platform to support the Wii MotionPlus feature, utilizing it to enable more advanced gestures,

Features
Virtua Tennis 2009 enhanced all of the features from VT3 although some are mostly kept the same:
 New create-a-player system is improved and fun to use as giving out the birthday date, a new posture feature to choose player service stances, waiting positions and others. A player may enter the first and last names like the other players; e.g. Lewis Bentley.
 New players such as Ana Ivanovic, Novak Djokovic, Andy Murray and Svetlana Kuznetsova as well as legends like Boris Becker and Tim Henman (Henman is chosen to be the player's coach).
 Enhanced courts and new-operated ball boys and ball girls (a similar feature in Smash Court Tennis 3).
 New environment sounds, crowds, background music and low-pitched grunts.
 Two new camera views with Normal view: Audience view and a Low-view camera, better known as over-the-shoulder camera.
 All new online-ranking system. A player can join and play with friends and in-game opponents to maintain ranking (no online play is available on the PC version).
 Additionally, there is a revamped offline ranking system including 239 male and 241 female players made by the developers. Some make cameos as opponents, like famous people such as Beverley Turner, and others such as Sumo Digital worker Steve Lycett. Other people are not famous and made canonically, such as Lian Fournier, Michelle Reveley, Matthew Squires, etc.
 New home-select feature with nationality-detector (the player's nationality depends on their home).
 It has a new weather-system that makes clouds move.
 There is a new generated 3D crowd and people. They move and cheer whenever players give a winning shot and they also make noise whenever the players stumble during long rallies.
Court Feature: New speed of balls like high and slow balls in clay courts, faster and lower in hard and grass courts.
 Dives from the male players is now replaced by a stumble for less recovery and less chance of noise.
 Smashes from lobs of other players could be now missed more for more realism.
 Service or serves is now sensitive to control especially in Wii for harder control of making MAX serve to make it more realistic.
 Service sometimes goes out, goes wide, etc. to make it more realistic.
 When turning off in-game or match music, it gives the player more concentration and more realistic experience.
 Items are not anymore collected from tournaments and may buy them in the tennis store.
 Tennis Store: Players can use money earned in tournaments to purchase equipment such as racquets and clothing in stores, as well as court passes for use in exhibition mode.
 Tennis stars have more details and their features are more realistic.
 There is a new Main Menu design and changed Character Selection screen.

Virtua Tennis 2009 brought new players to use and play (with 11 male players, 9 female players, and 3 male legends to choose from).

Game Content

Playable Characters

  Roger Federer
  Rafael Nadal
  Novak Djokovic
  Andy Murray
  Andy Roddick
  David Nalbandian
  James Blake
  David Ferrer
  Mario Ancic
  Tommy Haas
  Juan Carlos Ferrero
  Stefan Edberg (Unlockable)

  Venus Williams
  Ana Ivanovic
  Svetlana Kuznetsova
  Amelie Mauresmo
  Maria Sharapova
  Anna Chakvetadze
  Daniela Hantuchova
  Nicole Vaidisova
  Lindsay Davenport
  Boris Becker (Unlockable)
  Tim Henman (Unlockable)

Reception

The game received a somewhat mixed reception. Metacritic scored both PlayStation 3 and Xbox 360 versions at 70%, and 68% on the PC. Play UK called it "the best in the series so far", but also admitted that "the action may feel far too familiar to owners of Virtua Tennis 3". IT Reviews said it was "a terrific tennis game yet, conversely, an unnecessary one", also concluding that "it adds too little to Virtua Tennis 3". Eurogamer pointed out that the online multiplayer had been improved, but otherwise complained about a "general lack of ambition".

There were concerns that the competition was too easy, taking as much as 10 hours of gameplay before facing a competent opponent. Even the online action often suffered from lag and jitteriness and players "teleporting" to instantly jump across the screen. Impulse Gamer gave Virtua Tennis 2009 7 out of 10 saying that "[Virtua Tennis 2009] is incredibly familiar if you’ve played Virtua Tennis 3 and seeing as that came out three years ago it’s not particularly a good thing".

References

2009 video games
IOS games
Nintendo Wi-Fi Connection games
PlayStation 3 games
Video games developed in the United Kingdom
Wii MotionPlus games
Wii Wi-Fi games
Windows games
Xbox 360 games
Video games set in Australia
Video games set in Brazil
Video games set in Canada
Video games set in France
Video games set in Germany
Video games set in Hong Kong
Video games set in Japan
Video games set in Morocco
Video games set in Qatar
Video games set in Russia
Video games set in Singapore
Video games set in South Africa
Video games set in Spain
Video games set in Sweden
Video games set in the United Kingdom
2009
Tennis video games
Multiplayer and single-player video games
Video games set in Thailand
Sumo Digital games
Cultural depictions of Ana Ivanovic